Notre Dame is a Sixth Form College in Leeds, West Yorkshire, England. 
The college is situated on Saint Mark's Avenue, near to the engineering departments of the University of Leeds in Woodhouse, Leeds. It is near the (formerly C of E) St Mark's Church, Woodhouse, Leeds, and the Leeds Universities Catholic Church and Centre. It provides A-Level and vocational full time courses in further education.

History
In 1898 the Sisters of Notre Dame de Namur came to Leeds and to the two-classroomed parish school of St Anne's situated behind it. In 1904 the main part of what is now the Sixth Form College was built and opened as Notre Dame Collegiate School for Girls from the age of eleven to fourteen.

Notre Dame was one of three catholic direct grant grammar schools in Leeds, and the second that was all-female from 1946. It later was known as Notre Dame Grammar School. The school was handed over to the diocese in the 1970s when the Sisters of Notre Dame changed their focus to education in developing countries.

The school became the Notre Dame High School in 1978, a catholic comprehensive school for ages 13–19 with around 650 girls. All the other Catholic direct grant schools in Leeds also changed in this year.

The sixth form college was formed in September 1989 as the sixth form centre for Catholic education in Leeds. It was decided to merge boys and girls sixth-forms together in one college (from, Notre Dame High School itself, Mount St Mary's, St Michael's College and Cardinal Heenan Catholic High School). For nearly ninety years before this, a girls’ school was present on the same site. This was one of a network of girls’ secondary schools in England and Scotland which belonged to the Sisters of Notre Dame de Namur. Admissions for girls (Year 3, age 13–14 years old) ceased in 1989, with the school pupils present moving up each year, and a growing Sixth Form admissions.

Admissions
Notre Dame currently has student body of approx 2,000 pupils between the 2 years (of A levels); giving it a ten times larger student body than the average Leeds Sixth form. It is a Roman Catholic faith institution, and the only one of that denomination in the city for ages 16–18.

Notable alumni

 Matty Lee
 Gabby Logan nee Yorath
 Jonathan Mason (actor)
 Akierra Missick, Turks and Caicos Islands politician and lawyer

Notre Dame Collegiate School for Girls
 Janet Dibley, actress who played Lorna Cartwright in EastEnders in the late 1990s
 Prof Monica Grady, Professor of Planetary and Space Sciences since 2005 at the Open University, who gave the Royal Institution Christmas Lectures in 2003
 Lady Parkinson, journalist and television presenter, and wife of Sir Michael Parkinson
 Kazia Pelka, Polish-heritage actress who played Anna Wolska in Brookside, and sister of actor Valentine Pelka
 Patricia Ruanne, ballerina
 Marion Ryan, singer

See also
 List of direct grant grammar schools
 Notre Dame High School (Sheffield)

References

External links
 Official Website
 EduBase

Education in Leeds
Educational institutions established in 1904
Sisters of Notre Dame de Namur schools
Catholic secondary schools in the Diocese of Leeds
Sixth form colleges in West Yorkshire
E
1904 establishments in England